Nightmare on Providence Street is the second and last studio album of the Canadian deathcore band Blind Witness. It was produced by Michael Rashmawi and released on  through Mediaskare Records.

A music video was made for "Baby One More Notch". The last song, "The New Year", is used by the NHL's Buffalo Sabres as their theme song.

Track list

Credits 
Production and performance credits are adapted from the album liner notes.

Blind Witness
 Jonathan Cabana – vocals
 Maxime Lacroix – guitars
 Jon Campbell – guitars
 Miguel Lepage – bass
 Eric Morotti – drums

Guest musicians
 Chris Blair (ex-As Blood Runs Black) – vocals on "All Alone"
 Ricky Hoover (ex-Suffokate) – vocals on "Nightmare on Providence Street"
 Jon Vigil (The Ghost Inside) – vocals on "Baby One More Notch"
 Jonny Santos (Spineshank, Silent Civilian) – vocals on "For Life"

Additional
 Michael Rashmawi  – production, engineering
 Zack Ohren – mixing, mastering

Artwork
 Sean Widup (Widup Art) – Artwork

External links 
 

2010 albums
Blind Witness albums
Mediaskare Records albums